Adam James Bergen (born September 3, 1983) is a former American football tight end. He was signed by the Arizona Cardinals as an undrafted free agent in 2005. He played college football at Lehigh.

Bergen has also been a member of the Dallas Cowboys, Baltimore Ravens and Denver Broncos.

Professional career

Arizona Cardinals
Undrafted in the 2005 NFL Draft, Bergen signed with the Arizona Cardinals as an undrafted free agent.  In 2005, he played in all 16 games the Cardinals that year, starting nine, and caught 28 passes for 270 yards and one touchdown.

In 2006, he played in 14 games, starting seven, and caught 15 passes for 111 yards and one touchdown.  He was placed on the IR after week 14 due to a knee injury.

Dallas Cowboys
In the 2007 offseason, Bergen signed with the Dallas Cowboys.  He was released on September 1 prior to the regular season and spent the year out of football.

Baltimore Ravens
On July 22, 2008, Bergen was signed by the Baltimore Ravens.  He was released on August 30, 2008.

Denver Broncos
Bergen was signed to a future contract by the Denver Broncos on January 9, 2009. He was released on April 28, 2009.

Las Vegas Locomotives
Bergen was signed by the Las Vegas Locomotives of the United Football League on August 5, 2009.

References

External links

Just Sports Stats

1983 births
Living people
American football tight ends
Arizona Cardinals players
Baltimore Ravens players
Dallas Cowboys players
Denver Broncos players
Las Vegas Locomotives players
Lehigh Mountain Hawks football players
People from Seaford, New York
Players of American football from New York (state)
Sportspeople from Nassau County, New York